Zula Inez Ferguson (February 27, 1899 - October 28, 1988) was an advertising manager at Blackstone's, Los Angeles.

Early life and family
Zula Inez Ferguson was born on February 27, 1899, in Paducah, Kentucky, the daughter of Hon. McDougal Ferguson (1858-1909) and Inez Kimbrough (1867–1902). 

She had 4 siblings: Garth K. (1887-1972), Lillian T., Elizabeth W., and McDougal Ferguson Jr.

The death of her father, known as Mac D. Ferguson, was tragic: he was struck by malarian fever in 1909 that combined with the diabetes he was already ill, took him to death in few months. He was born on May 16, 1858, in Montgomery County, Tennessee, and moved with his parents to Ballard County, Kentucky. He began to study law in Louisville. He was curator of A. & M. College four years. In 1891-1892-1893 he was elected to the legislature as a representative from Ballard and Carlisle counties. He took his seat as state senator in 1897 and 1901. In 1903 he was elected state railroad commissioner from the First district. He was re-elected in 1907 and at his death was serving his second term. As railroad commissioner Ferguson represented 37 counties as the state is divided into three district, and his re-election testified to his popularity. His father was Rev. John D. Ferguson, a Christian preacher, and Ferguson was a member of the First Christian church of Paducah. He resided in Paducah about five years, but moved back to his old home. He was a member of the Ingleside lodge of Odd Fellows, and of the Paducah lodge of Elks. He is buried at Mt. Pleasant cemetery, two miles from La Center.

Zula Inez Ferguson attended Vanderbilt University (B.A.) and Columbia University (M.A.). She studied law at Vanderbilt, University of Kentucky and University of Southern California. 

She was a member of Phi Delta Delta and Alpha Xi Delta.

Career

Ferguson was Advertising manager at Blackstone's, Los Angeles. She engaged in various advertising and publicity positions.

Personal life
She lived at 322 North Alexandria Avenue, Little Armenia, Los Angeles.

References

1899 births
1988 deaths
Vanderbilt University alumni
Columbia University alumni
University of Kentucky alumni
University of Southern California alumni
People from Paducah, Kentucky
Kentucky businesswomen
20th-century American businesspeople
20th-century American businesswomen
Businesspeople from Los Angeles